The 2011 Lebanese Elite Cup is the 14th edition of this football tournament in Lebanon. It will be held from 10 to 24 September 2011. This tournament includes the six best teams from the 2010–11 Lebanese Premier League season.

Teams

Group stage

Group A

Group B 

* A toss was made between Al Ansar and Al-Mabarrah to determine the winner in which Al-Mabarrah won and qualified for semifinal.

Final Stage

Semi finals

Final

References 
Results

Lebanese Elite Cup seasons
Elite